Timothy Joseph "T. J." Burton (born July 30, 1983 in Ottawa) is a Canadian former professional baseball  player.

Life

He attended Notre Dame High School (Ottawa). He was selected by the Cleveland Indians in the 18th Round (547th overall) of the 2001 Major League Baseball draft. Burton played in the Cleveland Indians and Houston Astros minor league systems from 2002 to 2010.

Burton was a part of the Canada national baseball team at the 2008 Summer Olympics and 2009 World Baseball Classic.

References

External links 

1983 births
Living people
Akron Aeros players
Canadian expatriate baseball players in the United States
Corpus Christi Hooks players
Baseball pitchers
Baseball people from Ontario
Baseball players at the 2008 Summer Olympics
Burlington Indians players (1986–2006)
Kinston Indians players
Lake County Captains players
Mahoning Valley Scrappers players
Olympic baseball players of Canada
Round Rock Express players
Sportspeople from Ottawa
Surprise Rafters players
World Baseball Classic players of Canada
2009 World Baseball Classic players